Leave It to Smith is a 1933 British comedy film directed by and starring Tom Walls. It also featured Carol Goodner, Anne Grey, Peter Gawthorne and Basil Radford. It is also known as Just Smith.

The film was based on a play by Frederick Lonsdale and produced by Michael Balcon. It was made at the Lime Grove Studios with sets by the German art director Alfred Junge.

Cast
 Tom Walls as Smith
 Carol Goodner as Mary Linkley
 Anne Grey as Lady Moynton
 Allan Aynesworth as Lord Trench
 Eva Moore as Lady Trench
 Reginald Gardiner as Lord Redwood
 Veronica Rose as Lady Redwood
 Hartley Power as John Mortimer
 Basil Radford as Sir John Moynton
 Peter Gawthorne as Rolls
 Leslie Perrins as Duke of Bristol

References

Bibliography
 Low, Rachael. Filmmaking in 1930s Britain. George Allen & Unwin, 1985.
 Wood, Linda. British Films, 1927-1939. British Film Institute, 1986.

External links

1933 films
1933 comedy films
British comedy films
Films set in England
British films based on plays
Films shot at Lime Grove Studios
Gainsborough Pictures films
Films directed by Tom Walls
British black-and-white films
1930s English-language films
1930s British films